La hora marcada is a 1986 Mexican television anthology series presenting horror and science fiction in the vein of The Twilight Zone, originally aired from 1988 to 1990 by Canal de las Estrellas, with half-hour episodes, and re-broadcast from 1997 to 1999 at various times by Channel 9 (Mexico) and local Televisa channels. Although virtually unknown outside Mexico, it achieved a popular and critical success in that region. The series was the first opportunity for many Mexican filmmakers to venture into the genre of horror, and its rotating cast of writers and directors included Emmanuel Lubezki, Guillermo del Toro and Alfonso Cuarón.

Characters 
The "Woman in Black" (La Dama De Negro), who typically makes cameo appearances wearing a long dress and a black veil in the background near the middle or end of many episodes, and sometimes plays a more active role in the episode, is a personification of Death. She was played by several actresses; among the most frequent: Frances Ondiviela, Margot Buzali, and Tere Hernandez.

In the 2007 spin-off series 13 Miedos ("Thirteen Fears"), this character is replaced by a similar character played by Constantino Morán, as a male narrator or horror host with black eyes without pupils, dressed in black, and portrayed as the devil.

Episodes

Crew 

Creator:  
 Carmen Armendáriz

Producers: 
 Fernando Saenz de Miera, 98 episodes
 Carmen Armendáriz, 100 episodes (1989-1990)
 Alfonso Cuarón 
 Emmanuel Lubezki

Directors, various including:
 Juan Mora Catlett
 Alfonso Cuarón
 Guillermo del Toro

Writers:
 Juan Mora Catlett
 Alfonso Cuarón
 Carlos Cuarón
 Guillermo del Toro

References

External links 
 At the Internet Movie Database
 A blog about La Hora Marcada series - Compiled by Luis Pedro Cabrera

Mexican anthology television series
Mexican horror fiction television series
Horror fiction television series
1980s science fiction television series
Mexican drama television series